The PEN Oakland/Josephine Miles Literary Award is for U.S. multicultural writers, to "promote works of excellence by writers of all cultural and racial backgrounds and to educate both the public and the media as to the nature of multicultural work." It was founded by PEN Oakland in 1991 and named in honor of Josephine Miles. PEN Oakland was founded in 1989. The award was dubbed the "Blue Collar PEN Award" by The New York Times.

In 1997, Pen Oakland inaugurated its PEN Oakland/Gary Webb Anti-Censorship Award to protest censorship practices within the U.S. Other awards are the PEN Oakland/Reginald Lockett Lifetime Achievement Award established in 2006; and the PEN Oakland/Adelle Foley Award established in 2016 and "given to a work, not fiction or poetry, that has done much to improve the relations between people in American society."

Although PEN Oakland unsuccessfully attempted to become the USA's third PEN center, the attempt did succeed in opening the doors for PEN Oakland to become a full chapter of the PEN Center USA. PEN Oakland also introduced a resolution for more equitable media coverage of minorities and ethnic groups. The group sponsored the Oakland Literature Expo portion of the City of Oakland’s Art & Soul Festival from 2001 through 2004.

The award is one of many PEN awards sponsored by International PEN affiliates in over 145 PEN centres around the world.

Josephine Miles Award 
Source:

2021 Joy Harjo, LeAnne Howe, and Jennifer Foerster; Nguyen Phan Que Mai; Derf Backderf; Christopher Bernard; Daphne Brooks; Nikki Giovanni; Terry McMillan
2020 Nick Estes, Sigrun Susan Lane, Jericho Brown, Maya Khosla, Jillian Weise, Jia Tolentino, Stephanie McCurry
2019 Richard Powers; Alicia Garza, Opal Tometi and Patrisse Khan-Cullers; Ha Jin; Jamel Brinkley; David Blight; Kalamu ya Salaam; Vernon Keeve III; James Cagney, Jason Lutes
2018 Andrew Sean Greer, Jerome Rothenberg, Julie Lythcott-Haims, M.L. Liebler, Paul Ortiz, Percival Everett, Tongo Eisen-Martin
2017 Randa Jarrar, Gerald Horne, MK Chavez, Nancy Isenberg, Arturo Mantecon, Kurt Schweigman and Lucille Lang Day, John Edgar Wideman
2016 Elizabeth Alexander, Ta-Nehisi Coates, Frances Gateward, Latif Harris, Juan Felipe Herrera, John Jennings, Gerald Vizenor
2015 Natasha Trethewey, Lenelle Moïse, Claudia Rankine, Peter Herris, Deborah A. Miranda, Roxanne Dunbar-Ortiz
2014 Daniel Chacon, Edwidge Danticat, Claudia Moreno Pisano, Roger Reeves, Nina Serrano, Akinyele Omowale Umoja
2013 Andrew Lam, Luis J. Rodriguez, Denise M. Sandoval, Lucille Lang Day, Toni Morrison, Tim Seibles, Christopher Wagstaff
2012 Melinda Palacio, Michael Warr, Aurora Harris, Deena Metzger, Ed Sanders, Mary Mackey, Jesmyn Ward
2011 Devreaux Baker, N. Banerjee, J. P. Dancing Bear, John Farris, Jim Harrison, S. Kaipa, Lola Shoneyin, Barry Spector, P. Sundaralingam, Susan Suntree, Gary Snyder, Eric Miles Willamson
2010 Clifton Ross, Elizabeth Nunez, Etel Adnan, Manuel Ruben Delgado, Andrena Zawinski, Maria Espinosa, Mitch Horowitz, Ivan J. Houston
2009 Doren Robbins, Charles L. Robinson & Al Young, Herbert Gold, Janice Blue, C. Paolo Caruso, Richard Bruce Nugent
2008 Joanne Kyger, Rosa Martha Villarreal, Rebecca Solnit, Juan Felipe Herrera, Colleen J. McElroy, Cecil Brown, Colson Whitehead
2007 Will Alexander, Karla Andersdatter, Kathleen de Azevedo, Steve Dalachinsky, Adam P. Kennedy, William Poy Lee, Lorena Oropeza & Dionne Espinoza, Harriet A. Washington
2006 David Hilliard, Mike Madison, Gerald Haslam, Eric Gansworth, Jennifer Murphy, Mona Lisa Saloy, Richard Silberg, A. D. Winans
2005 David Meltzer, Neeli Cherkovski, Derek Walcott, Jeffery Paul Chan, Suhayl Saadi, Aldon Lynn Nielsen
2004 Edgardo Vega Yunqué, Noemi Sohn, Lewis Robinson, Monique Truong, Jill Nelson, Fred Reiss
2003 Clive Matson and Allan Cohen, Gail Tsukiyama, Paul Flores, Ghada Karmi, Jack Hirschman, Luis J. Rodriguez, Jewel Parker Rhodes
2002 A. Van Jordon, Nathalie Handal, Myronn Hardy, Agha Shahid Ali, Charles Rubin
2001 Mary Monroe, Dan Leone, Yehuda Amichai, Lesa Lowitz, Leslie Marmon Silko, Jervey Tervalon
2000 Jose Garcia Villa, Elmaz Abinader, Wendy Doniger, Rabbi Alan Lew, Nathan Englander, Eleanor Taylor Bland
1999 Darryl Babe Wilson, Mike Davis, Elaine Marcus Starkman & Marsha Lee Berkman, Ruth Forman, Koon Woon, Clyde P. Taylor
1998 John Mulligan, Ibrahim Fawal, Alfred Arteaga, Leslie Woodd, Marketa Groves
1997 Devorah Major, Percival Everett, Julie Shigekuni, Michael Lally, Kevin Killian, Ray Gonzalez
1996 Gerald Vizenor, Jerome Rothenberg & Pierre Joris, Norman Mailer, Reginald Lockett, Barbara Guest, Chitra Divakaruni
1995 Alma Luz Villanueva, E. Ethelbert Miller, Michael McClure, Marilyn Chin, Juvenal Acosta
1994 Peter J. Harris, Phyllis Burke, Brenda Lane Richardson, Clifford E. Trafzer, Russell Leong, Jerome Rothenberg, Paula Woods, Felix Liddell
1993 Francisco X. Alarcon, Opal Palmer Adisa, Lucha Corpi, Sylvia Lopez-Medina, Louis Owens, Sylvia Watanabe
1992 Luis J. Rodriguez, David Mura, Louis Edwards, Thomas King, David Ignatow, Julia Alvarez
1991 Gerald Vizenor, Jess Mowry, Li-Young Lee, Gerald Haslam, Joy Harjo, Gerald Stern

Gary Webb Anti-Censorship Award
Source:

2021 - Roxane Gay
2020 - Omarosa Manigault Newman
2019 - Kim Shuck
2018 - The Honorable Libby Schaaf
2016 - Museum of the African Diaspora
2015 - Lincoln Bergman
2014 - Abraham Bolden
2013 - Chris Hedges
2012 - Alexander Cockburn
2011 - WikiLeaks & Carole Simpson
2010 - Richard Prince
2009 - Jefferson Morely
2008 - Project Censored
2007 - Greg Palast
2006 - Bill Moyers
2005 - Kitty Kelley
2004 - George Julius Theodule
2003 - Sam Hamill
2002 - Barbara Lee
2001 - William Mandel, Rabbi Michael Lerner, Daniel Hernandez
2000 - Robert Parry
1999 - Mumia Abu-Jamal, Gary Webb
1998 - Gerald Nicosia
1997 - Floyd Salas

Reginald Lockett Lifetime Achievement Award
Source:

2021 - Genny Lim
2020 - Thomas Sanchez (writer), Robert Sward
2019 - Percival Everet
2018 - Ana Castillo
2016 - Clarence Major
2015 - Avotcja, Marvin X
2014 - Askia M. Toure
2013 - Jesse Douglas Taylor
2012 - Q.R. Hand
2011 - Adam David Miller
2010 - Paul Krassner, Vance Bourjaily
2009 - A.D. Winans, Harriet Rohmer, Kristin Hunter Lattany
2008 - Reginald Lockett, Adrienne Kennedy, Diane di Prima
2007 - Andy Ross
2006 - Joyce Jenkins

Adelle Foley Award
Source:

2021 - Margaret Porter Troupe, Gavin Newsom
2020 - Henry Dumas
2019 - Alexandria Ocasio-Cortez
2018 - Avotcja
2016 - Shira A. Scheindlin

Reginald Martin Award for Excellence in Criticism

2021 - Jerry W. Ward, Jr.

References

External links
 PEN Oakland awards

 
Awards established in 1991
1991 establishments in California
Literary awards honoring minority groups
San Francisco Bay Area literature
Culture of Oakland, California